McEnroe may refer to:

McEnroe (surname)
John McEnroe, tennis player
McEnroe (TV series), 2004 chat show hosted by the tennis player
Mcenroe (rapper), stage name of Rod Bailey, Canadian rapper

See also
McInroe, surname